This is a list of circumnavigations of Earth. Sections are ordered by ascending date of completion.

Global

Nautical

16th century
After Magellan was killed by Lapulapu off the Philippines on 27 April 1521, the circumnavigation was completed under the command of the Basque Spanish seafarer Juan Sebastián Elcano who returned to Sanlúcar de Barrameda, Spain, on 6 September 1522, after a journey of 3 years and 1 month. These men were the first to circumnavigate the globe in a single expedition. Enrique of Malacca, an interpreter from Sumatra who accompanied Magellan to Europe in 1511 and was part of Magellan's expedition, survived the Battle of Mactan. Enrique left the expedition on May 1 in Cebu, presumably to make the trip home. As Enrique is familiar with the region and Magellan had decreed in his will that Enrique is to be freed from service upon his death, he may have returned home to Sumatra. However, there is currently no historical record of Enrique completing his return to Sumatra after the Spanish left Cebu.
 The survivors of García Jofre de Loaísa's Spanish expedition 1525–1536 including Andrés de Urdaneta; westward from Spain. None of Loaísa's seven ships completed the voyage, but Santa María de la Victoria reached the Moluccas before being wrecked in a Portuguese attack. Successive chiefs of the expedition (Loaísa, Elcano, Salazar, Iñiguez, De la Torre) died during the voyages. Andrés de Urdaneta and other fellow men survived, reaching the Spice Islands in 1526, to be taken prisoner by the Portuguese. Urdaneta and a few of his men returned to Spain in 1536 aboard Portuguese ships via India, the Cape of Good Hope and Portugal, and completed the second world circumnavigation in history. One of the four survivors was Hans von Aachen, who was also one of the 18 survivors of Magellan's expedition, making him the first to circumnavigate the world twice.
Drake was the first to complete a circumnavigation as captain while leading the expedition throughout the entire circumnavigation.
 Martín Ignacio de Loyola; 1580–1584, westward from Spain.
 Martín Ignacio de Loyola; 1585–1589, eastward from Spain (via Macau (then a Portuguese territory), China, and Acapulco, Mexico) to become the first to circumnavigate the world eastwards and first to use overland routes in his circumnavigation.
 João da Gama; 1584 (or 1585)–1590; eastward from Portugal; from Lisbon to India, Malacca, Macau (then Portuguese) and Japan. Gama crossed the Pacific at a higher northern latitude; was taken prisoner in Mexico and carried in Spanish ships to the Iberian Peninsula. One of the first to go eastwards, mostly by sea.

17th century
 The survivors of the expedition of Jacques Mahu; 1598–1601; westward from Holland; Of Mahu's five ships only one returned.
 The survivors of the expedition of Olivier van Noort; 1598–1601; westward from Holland; Of Van Noort's four ships only one returned.
 Francesco Carletti; Florentine merchant; 1594–1602; westward from Italy; travelled across the American continent overland, through Panama. All Carletti's other travel was by sea until he ended in the Netherlands; he travelled from there overland back to Italy. Carletti was perhaps the first to travel all legs as a passenger, not as a ship's officer or a crew member. Carletti described his journey in his autobiography, "My Voyage Around the World", translated into various languages.
 Joris van Spilbergen; 1614–1617; westward from Holland.
 Willem Schouten and Jacob Le Maire; 1615–1617; westward from Holland; in Eendraght; Discovered Cape Horn and the first expedition to enter the Pacific via the Drake Passage.
 Admiral Jacques l'Hermite and vice-admiral John Hugo Schapenham and rear-admiral Jan Willemszn Verschoor; 1623–1626; westward from Holland.
 Pedro Cubero; 1670–1679; eastward from Spain; the first maritime circumnavigation including significant travel overland.
 William Dampier (English); 1679–1691; westward from England.
 Gemelli Careri; 1693–1698; eastward from Naples; the first tourist to circumnavigate the globe, paying his own way on multiple voyages, crossing Mexico on land.

18th century

 William Funnell (English); 1703–1706.
 William Dampier (English); 1703–1706.
 Woodes Rogers (English); 1708–1711; with the Duke and the Duchess; He rescued Alexander Selkirk on Juan Fernandez on 31 January 1709. Selkirk had been stranded there for four years.
 William Dampier (English); 1708–1711; First person to circumnavigate the world three times (1679–1691, 1703–1707 and 1708–1711).
Dolphin was the first ship to survive two circumnavigations.
 Louis de Bougainville; 1766–1769; On board was Jeanne Baré, disguised as a man, the first woman to circumnavigate the globe; first French circumnavigation.
 Alessandro Malaspina; 1786–1788.
 Robert Gray; 1787–1790; first American circumnavigation.
 John Boit (American maritime fur trader); 1794–1796; in Union; first sloop of her size and rig to sail around the world.

19th century

 Ignacio Maria de Alava; 1795–1803; in Montañés, flagship of a Spanish Navy [squadron.
 Adam Johann von Krusenstern and Yuri Lisyansky; 1803–1806; the first Russian circumnavigation.
 Hipólito Bouchard/Hippolyte de Bouchard;1817-1819; in "La Argentina"; the first Argentine circumnavigation.
 Fabian Gottlieb von Bellingshausen and Mikhail Lazarev; 1819–1821; the first circumnavigation mostly between 60° and 70° S, discovered Antarctica and the first islands south of the Antarctic Circle.
 ; 1826–1827; as part of her assuming the role of the flagship of the South American station squadron, from England via Cape of Good Hope, Burma, Australia and Brazil, returning to England via the Caribbean.
 , 3 September 1826 – 8 June 1830; from New York by way of Cape Horn, visiting the Hawaiian islands in 1829 and Macau in 1830. Her return voyage was made by way of China, the Philippines, the Indian Ocean, and the Cape of Good Hope. After nearly four years, Vincennes arrived back in New York under Commander William B. Finch. Two days later the ship was decommissioned.
 ; 19 August 1831 – 23 May 1834; Commodore John Downes commanding, departed New York for the first Sumatran Expedition via the Cape of Good Hope, and returned via Cape Horn to Boston.
 Sir George Simpson; 1841–1842; made the first "land circumnavigation" by crossing Canada and Siberia.
 ; May 1844 – September 1846; commanded by Captain John Percival.
 The paddle sloop ; 1845–1847; first steamship circumnavigation.
 The first Galathea expedition; 1845–1847; first Danish circumnavigation.
 ; 1845–1851; Discovered Herald Island in the Bering Straits while searching for the Sir John Franklin Expedition.
 The screw frigate Amazonas; 1856–1858; first Peruvian circumnavigation.
 ; 1857–1859; first Austrian circumnavigation.
 ; 1864–65; only Confederate ship to circumnavigate. Captain James Iredell Waddell.
 Casto Méndez Núñez; 1865–1868; aboard Numancia; first ironclad warship circumnavigation; "Enloricata navis que primo terram circuivit".
Ulysses S. Grant; 1877-1879; included the first meeting of a former United States president (Grant) and a monarch of the United Kingdom, Queen Victoria.
 The corvette Vital de Oliveira; 19 November 1879 – 21 January 1881; commanded by Júlio César de Noronha; first Brazilian circumnavigation.
 King Kalākaua; 1881; first monarch to circumnavigate the globe.
 Nellie Bly; 1889–1890; one of the first female journalists to solo circumnavigate the globe at the record-breaking 72 days.
 Fernando Villaamil; 1892–1894; aboard Nautilus; first training ship circumnavigation.
 Joshua Slocum; 1895–1898; first single-handed circumnavigation.

20th century
 The Great White Fleet; 1907–1909; first fleet to circumnavigate the world.
 HMS  New Zealand 1913, first by a Dreadnought era battleship or battlecruiser.
 Harry Pidgeon; 1921–1925; second single-handed circumnavigation.
 Conor O'Brien; 1923 - 1925; in Saoirse,  a 20 ton 42 ft ketch, designed by himself and built in Baltimore, Ireland. First small private craft to circumnavigate west to east and south of the three great capes: Cape Horn, Cape of Good Hope and Cape Leeuwin SW Australia - the Clipper route.
 Francesco Aurelio Geraci; 1932–1935; first italian to circumnavigate the globe with his little wooden ship M.A.S. (Memento Audere Semper).
 Harry Pidgeon; 1932–1937; third single-handed circumnavigation, first person to circumnavigate solo twice (1921–1925 and 1932–1937).
 Electa and Irving Johnson; 1934–1958; sail training pioneers, circumnavigated the world seven times with amateur crews.
 Vito Dumas; 1942; single handed circumnavigation of the southern oceans, including the first single handed passage of all three great capes.
 Operation Sandblast; 1960; ; first underwater circumnavigation.
 1966 Soviet submarine global circumnavigation; 1966; K-133 and K-116; first underwater circumnavigation conducted by the Soviet Union. 
 Sir Francis Chichester; 1966–1967; first single-handed circumnavigation with just one port of call.
 Sir Alec Rose; 1967–1968; single-handed circumnavigation with two stops (in Australia and New Zealand).
 Leonid Teliga; 1967–1969; single-handed circumnavigation aboard SY Opty.
 Robin Knox-Johnston; 1968–1969; first single-handed non-stop circumnavigation.
 Robin Lee Graham; 1965–1970; then youngest (at ages 16–21) solo circumnavigation aboard 24-foot sailboat Dove.
 Chay Blyth; 1971; first westwards single-handed non-stop circumnavigation.
 Edward Allcard; 1957–1973; circumnavigation via the three great capes aboard his 36-foot wooden ketch Sea Wanderer.
 Webb Chiles; solo circumnavigation 6 times, with the first being in 1975-1976
 Jon Sanders; 1970–2021; completed eleven circumnavigations.
 1970 First solo circumnavigation trip east to west mostly sailing through tropics.
 1981–82 Double nonstop solo circumnavigation west to east via Southern Ocean.
 1986–88 Triple non-stop solo circumnavigation: 657 days 21 hours and 18 minutes at sea. Guinness World Records cites this as the longest distance sailed non-stop by any vessel (71,023 nautical miles)
 2016–17 Completed 10th circumnavigation at the age of 78, mostly singlehanded.
 2019-21 Completed 11th circumnavigation at the age of 81
 ; ETR-3 crew September 1972 - September 1973 Circumnavigation via Panama Canal Norfolk VA. East to west.
 Krystyna Chojnowska-Liskiewicz; 1976–1978; first woman to perform a single-handed circumnavigation.
 Naomi James; 1977–1978; first woman to perform a single-handed circumnavigation via Cape Horn.
 Mark Schrader; 1982; completed two solo circumnavigations. In 1982–1983 became the first American to complete a solo circumnavigation via the five southernmost capes.
 Marvin Creamer; 21 December 1982 – 17 May 1984; only known person to circumnavigate the globe by boat with no nautical aids
 Bertie Reed – 1982 – the first South African to complete three singlehanded circumnavigations.
 Nikolay Dzambasov; 1 September 1983 – 25 July 1985; the first Bulgarian to circumnavigate the globe; traveled in a self-made yacht.
 David Scott Cowper; 1985; first single-handed circumnavigation by motor boat.
 Peter Freeman; 14 October 1984 – 14 July 1985; Skippered a Hartley 32 ferro-cement sloop Laiviņa, from Victoria, British Columbia, Canada in 236 days.  Set a new Guinness World Record.
 Dodge Morgan; 12 November 1985 – 11 April 1986; Aboard sailboat American Promise, became first American to sail solo around the world, non-stop.
 ; 28 September 1985 – 10 January 1987; First Indian circumnavigation by an Indian Army Corps of Engineers crew. Also had the first handicapped (one-legged) sailor to sail around the globe.
 Serge Testa; 1987; an Australian yachtsman who holds the world record for the circumnavigation in the smallest boat, completing the voyage in 1987, in his 11-foot-10-inch (3.61 m) boat, the Acrohc Australis.
 Teddy Seymour; 1987; aboard sailboat Love Song; the first African-American to complete solo single-handed circumnavigation.
 Mike Plant; 1987–1991; completed three circumnavigations.
 1986–87: Won the BOC Challenge with a time of 157 days aboard Airco Distributor, an Open 50 sloop built by Plant and designed by Roger Martin.
 1989: Competed in the first Vendée Globe on Duracell, an Open 60 sloop built by Plant and designed by Roger Martin. Although eliminated from the race after receiving help with a rudder repair in New Zealand, Plant still set a record for the fastest American to sail single-handed around the world with a time of 135 days.
 1990/91: Finished 4th overall in the BOC Challenge, setting the highest mark in a solo-sailing event for an American with a time of 132 days.
 Tania Aebi; 1985–1987; American woman who completed a solo circumnavigation by the age of 21, one  stretch with crew disqualified her from an official record.
 Kay Cottee; 1988; first woman to perform a solo non-stop circumnavigation.
 David Scott Cowper; 1990; first single-handed circumnavigation via the North West Passage.
 Duncan McQueen; 1992–1999;
 Pat Lawless Snr; 1993-1996 Irish solo sailor, took him 3 years and 3 days in his 32 foot yacht Loon. He returned to Limerick, Ireland at the age of 70 after his solo circumnavigation.
 Lisa Clayton; 1994–1995; first British woman to sail single-handed and non-stop around the world.
 Brian Caldwell; 1995–1996; '1st-Under-Age-21' to complete solo circumnavigation with stops, completed by age 20.
 David Dicks; 1996; youngest recognized assisted circumnavigation, completed aged 18 years 41 days.
 Henk de Velde; 1997; sailed a catamaran eastbound around the world in 119 days, non-stop. He is still the only person in the world to perform this feat single-handed with a catamaran, although others have made faster single-handed circumnavigations in trimarans (Ellen MacArthur, 2005, and Francis Joyon, 2008).
 Cable and Wireless Adventurer; 1998; 74 days, 20 hours, 58 minutes, a new Guinness World Record for a powered vessel.
 Robert E. Case; 1998–2001; American who was the first solo amputee to sail around the world.
 Amyr Klink; 1998–1999; Brazilian who completed a solo circumnavigation of Antarctica in 88 days.
 Jesse Martin; 1999; youngest recognized unassisted circumnavigation, completed aged 18 years 66 days.
 Azhar Mansor; 1999; first Malaysian to sail solo around the world.
 Alex Thomson; 1999; youngest skipper ever to win a round the world race (Clipper 1998–1999).
 Daniel D. Moreland; 1997–1998; first circumnavigation of sail training vessel .
 Vinny Lauwers; 1999–2000; 233d 13h 43m 8s; 21760 nm; Vision Quest; first single-handed circumnavigation by a disabled sailor (paraplegic).
 Wladek Wagner, 1932-1939, first Polish citizen to sail around the world. He wrote the book By the Sun and Stars about the voyage.

21st century
 Wilfried Erdmann; 14 August 2000 – 23 July 2001 in 343 days; monohull Kathena Nui; solo westward non-stop circumnavigation.
 Ellen MacArthur; 2001; monohull; circumnavigated singlehandedly as the then fastest woman.
 Mike Golding; 2001; first person to circumnavigate non-stop in both eastward and westward directions. 1993 World record for a westward circumnavigation, 161 days, Group 4. 2001 Vendee Globe Race 7th position.
 ; 2003–2004; first Indian sail naval ship to circumnavigate the globe with the theme of "building bridges of friendship across the oceans".
 Bruno Peyron and crew; 2005; aboard maxi catamaran Orange II; set the then current windpowered circumnavigation record, 50 days, 16 hours, 20 minute.
 Ellen MacArthur; 2005; trimaran B&Q/Castorama; then the fastest singlehanded circumnavigation (71 days), is still the fastest woman in 2010. See also 2001.
 Dee Caffari; first female to sail non-stop round the world westabout and both ways;
 2005–2006; first woman to perform a solo westward non-stop circumnavigation, in 178 days.
 2008-2009 Vendee Globe Race (Solo Nonstop Eastabout)	onboard IMOCA 60 Aviva in 99 days 1 hrs 10 min 57 sec
 ; 2007; First circumnavigation of the globe by a Spanish warship in 142 years.
 ; 2007 world cruise; at 148,528 gross ton, the world's largest passenger ship to circumnavigate the globe.
 Francis Joyon; 2008;  IDEC 2; fastest singlehanded multihull circumnavigation at that time, 57 days 13 hours 34 minutes 06 seconds.
 Michael Perham; 2009; then youngest person (aged 16–17 years) to perform a singlehanded circumnavigation (with stops, through Panama Canal).
 Franck Cammas and a crew of 10; 2010; French trimaran Groupama 3; set the fastest maritime circumnavigation at the time, in a time of 48 days, 7 hours 44 minutes and 52 seconds.
 Dilip Donde (Indian Navy); 2009–2010; first Indian to carry out a solo circumnavigation; stopped in four ports – Fremantle, Lyttelton, Port Stanley and Cape Town.
 Jessica Watson; 2009–2010; youngest person (aged 16) to perform a solo non-stop southern hemisphere circumnavigation (past Cape Horn).
 Reid Stowe; 2007–2010; eastbound circumnavigation, 1152 days; longest time spent at sea without resupply or touching land.
 Minoru Saito; 2008–2011; oldest person (aged 77) to perform a singlehanded circumnavigation (westbound, past Cape Horn, with stops). He has made eight singlehanded circumnavigations; after the seventh (which was non-stop) at age 71 he was already the oldest.
 PlanetSolar; 2010–2012; first solar vehicle to circumnavigate the globe.
 Laura Dekker; 2011–2012; youngest person (aged 14–16 years) to perform a singlehanded circumnavigation (with stops, through Panama Canal).
 Jerome Rand, Oct 2017 to June 2018, 271 day, unsponsored, nonstop circumnavigation from Gloucester MA on a Westsail 32 (Mighty Sparrow)
 British sailor Jeanne Socrates; 2018–2019; oldest woman (aged 77) to single-handedly sail around the world, non-stop without outside assistance, for a year oldest person until Bill Hatfield sailed at a higher age. Also oldest woman at the time (aged 70) to do the same thing 2012–2013, also making her first woman to make solo non-stop unassisted circumnavigation from west coast of North America (Victoria BC, Canada). Oldest, in 2010–2011 (aged 68), to sail single-handedly around the world, with stops. Both were eastbound via Cape Horn.
 Bill Hatfield; 2019-2020; oldest person (at 81) to sail solo non-stop unassisted single-handedly around the world, also first person (of any age) to sail solo non-stop unassisted single-handedly westabout (westbound) around the world in an under 40ft vessel.
 Abhilash Tomy (Indian Navy); 2012–2013; first Indian to sail solo, non-stop around the world without outside assistance. Sailed south of the five southernmost capes.
 Gerry Hughes; 2012–2013; first deaf yachtsman to sail single-handed around the world to pass the five great capes. On 1 September 2012, Hughes left Troon, Scotland to start his eight-month journey across the world. Hughes travel around the world solo, sailed 32,000 miles and became the first deaf yachtsman to passed all five southernmost capes.
  (Indian Navy); 2017–2018; six female naval officers sailed south of the five southernmost capes during their Navika Sagar Parikrama expedition; they stopped in Fremantle, Lyttelton, Port Stanley and Cape Town.
 2020–2021 Vendée Globe Race a total of 25 sailors completed a solo non-stop circumnavigation and 2 more completed a stopping.

Fastest

 Operation Sandblast; 1960; ; first underwater circumnavigation, and fastest mechanically powered circumnavigation (disputed with Earthrace, 2008), in 60 days 21 hours.
 Jon Sanders; 1986–1988; holds the world record for completing a single-handed, non-stop, triple circumnavigation, in 657 days 21 hours and 18 minutes.
 Jean-Luc Van Den Heede (French); 2004; fastest westward single-handed circumnavigation, 122 days 14 hours 3 minutes 49 seconds.
 Adrienne Cahalan (Australian); February–March 2004; fastest woman to complete a circumnavigation (crew of "Cheyenne") 58 days 9 hours 32 minutes 45 seconds.
 François Gabart (French); Nov 2017–Dec 2017; current fastest single-handed circumnavigation, in 42 days, 16 hours, 40 minutes, 35 seconds.
 Francis Joyon and crew of five sailors; Dec 2016–Jan 2017; the Maxi trimaran IDEC SPORT; current absolute (wind or mechanically powered) fastest maritime circumnavigation, in 40 days 23 hours 30 minutes 30 seconds of sailing.
 Bill Hatfield (Australian); 22 February 2020; fastest single-handed westbound circumnavigation in a vessel of under  in length: 258 days, 22 hours, 24 minutes, and 9 seconds

Aerial

 Two open-cockpit biplanar Douglas World Cruiser floatplanes of the United States Army Air Service, piloted by Lowell H. Smith, Leslie P. Arnold, Erik H. Nelson and John Harding Jr., made the first aerial circumnavigation, in 1924, taking 175 days, covering .
 LZ-127 Graf Zeppelin, in 1929, piloted by Hugo Eckener made the first circumnavigation by an airship.  It was also the then fastest aerial circumnavigation, in 21 days.
 In 1930, Charles Kingsford Smith completed the first circumnavigation by monoplane and first "true" circumnavigation (crossing equator) by air, in a journey spanning two years in all.
 In 1932, Wolfgang von Gronau made the first aerial circumnavigation by flying boat in a twin-engine Dornier seaplane, Gronland-Wal D-2053, in nearly four months, making 44 stops en route. He was accompanied by co-pilot Gerth von Roth, mechanic Franzl Hack, and radio operator Fritz Albrecht.
 In 1933, Wiley Post repeated his 1931 circumnavigation by aeroplane, but this time solo, using an autopilot and radio direction finder. He made the first solo aerial circumnavigation in a time one day faster than his previous record: 7 days, 19 hours, 49 minutes, in which he covered , but did not cross the equator.
 Following the Attack on Pearl Harbor in 1941, a Boeing 314 piloted by Robert Ford was forced to fly from Auckland, New Zealand to New York following the westerly route. Landing in Natal, Brazil and continuing on to New York, the Ford's Boeing 314 became the first commercial aircraft to circumnavigate the world.
 Richarda Morrow-Tait became the first woman pilot to fly around the world, accompanied by navigator Michael Townsend, in a year and a day, from 18 August 1948 to 19 August 1949.
 In 1949, the United States Air Force B-50 Superfortress Lucky Lady II made the first non-stop aerial circumnavigation in 94 hours and 1 minute. Four in-air refuelings were required for the flight, which covered .
 In 1957, three United States Air Force Boeing B-52 Stratofortresses made the first non-stop jet-aircraft circumnavigation in 45 hours and 19 minutes, with two in-air refuelings. The  flight was completed at an average speed of 525 miles per hour.
 Geraldine Mock, 1964, first woman to complete a solo aerial circumnavigation, in a Cessna 180.
 Flying Tigers Boeing 707, crewed by five airline pilots, completed the first circumnavigation via the poles, 14–17 November 1965, in 62 hours 27 minutes.

(Widespread introduction of Very Low Frequency navigational aids)
 Elgen Long, 1971, first solo circumnavigation via the poles, in a Piper Navajo.
 Don Taylor, 1976, first circumnavigation by homebuilt aircraft.
 Ross Perot, Jr. and Jay Coburn, 1982, first circumnavigation by helicopter, by Bell 206L-1 LongRanger II
 Dick Smith, 1982–1983, first solo circumnavigation by helicopter, in a Bell Jetranger III.
 Dick Rutan and Jeana Yeager, 1986, Voyager, first non-stop non-refueled circumnavigation in an airplane, 9 days, 3 minutes and 44 seconds.
 Dick Smith, 1988–1989, first circumnavigation landing at both poles, in a Twin Otter.
 In 1992 an Air France Concorde, registration F-BTSD, achieved the fastest non-orbital circumnavigation in 32 hours 49 minutes and 3 seconds.
 Fred Lasby, 1994, oldest circumnavigation, at 82 years of age, in Piper Comanche.
 Dick Smith, 1994–95, first east-west circumnavigation by helicopter, in a Sikorsky S-76, a distance traveled of 73,352 kilometres (39,407 nautical miles).
 Brian Milton, 1998, first microlight circumnavigation. He used an open-cockpit single engine Pegasus Quantum 912. No support aircraft escorted the flight. Keith Reynolds was copilot from Webridge, Surrey, to Yuzhno Sakhalinsk, Siberia. Then, as required by the Russian authorities, navigator Petr Petrov accompanied Milton to Nome, Alaska. Milton completed the rest of the 120-day voyage solo (71 flying days). 
 Bertrand Piccard and Brian Jones, 1999, first non-stop balloon circumnavigation in Breitling Orbiter 3, 19 days, 1 hour and 49 minutes, covering .
 Jennifer Murray, 2000, first solo circumnavigation by a woman by helicopter.
 Colin Bodill, 2000, first solo circumnavigation by a microlight (Mainair Blade) in 99 days. Also held fastest circumnavigation by microlight until broken. Bodill was part of an entourage of 4 aircraft, one of which carried supplies and support.
 Steve Fossett, 2 July 2002, first solo balloon circumnavigation.
 Matevž Lenarčič; 2004; Circumnavigation with microlight aircraft Pipistrel".
 Steve Fossett, 3 March 2005, GlobalFlyer, first non-stop, non-refueled solo circumnavigation in an airplane, 67 hours, covering .
 Steve Fossett, 11 February 2006, GlobalFlyer, longest non-stop, non-refueled solo flight (with circumnavigation) in an airplane, covering , in 76 hours and 45 minutes.
 Barrington Irving, 27 June 2007, Inspiration, youngest solo circumnavigation in an airplane, at that time, 23 years, 228 days; left Miami, Florida, March 23, 2007, first stop, Cleveland, Ohio. (record broken numerous times subsequently)
 Rahul Monga and Anil Kumar, 2007, fastest circumnavigation in a microlight, 79 days. Team from the Indian Air Force to commemorate the 75 Anniversary of the founding of the Indian Air Force. Aircraft used was a Flight Design CTSW. They covered  in a total flight time of 247 hours and 27 minutes.
 Matt Guthmiller became the youngest pilot to circumnavigate by aircraft, solo in 2014. Since then the record has been surpassed by Australian Lachlan Smart in 2016, American Mason Andrews in 2018 and Englishman Travis Ludlow in 2021.
 Swiss pilots Bertrand Piccard and André Borschberg, in the first circumnavigation by solar-powered aircraft, took off from Abu Dhabi aboard the Solar Impulse 2 on 9 March 2015, and were originally scheduled to complete their circumnavigation of the Northern Hemisphere in five months. Due to battery damage, continuation of the flight was postponed until April 2016. This circumnavigation was completed on 26 July 2016.
 Michael Smith, November 2015, first solo circumnavigation in a single-engine flying boat in Progressive Aerodyne SeaRey two-seater light sport aircraft
 Fyodor Konyukhov, 23 July 2016, broke the record for the fastest circumnavigation in a hot air balloon. He took "just over 11 days", breaking Steve Fossett's 2002 record of 13 and a half days.
 Peter Wilson and Matthew Gallagher; 7 August 2017; First circumnavigation by helicopter through antipodes.
 Ravinder Bansal, 20 August 2017, became the first person of Indian origin to complete a solo circumnavigation in a single engine plane.
 Shaesta Waiz, 4 October 2017, became the youngest woman to fly solo around the world in a single-engine aircraft, a feat superseded by Zara Rutherford.
 Norman Surplus, 28 June 2019, first Gyroplane/Autogyro circumnavigation. Using an open cockpit, Rotorsport UK MT-03 Autogyro (Registered G-YROX - "Roxy"), Surplus flew a distance of 27,000 NM, through 32 Countries and set 19x FAI new world records. Initial departure was on 22 March 2010, but difficulty with Russian permission delayed the aircraft in Japan for 3.5 years. The circumnavigation was reset/continued from the Evergreen Aviation and Space Museum, McMinnville, Oregon on 1 June 2015 and was finally successfully completed on return to the same place on 28 June 2019.
 Terry W. Virts and Hamish Harding, 11 July 2019, fastest circumnavigation of the globe via the North and South Poles. Virts and Harding headed a crew of eight in a Gulfstream G650ER jet to circumnavigate the globe in a time of 46 hours, 40 minutes and 22 seconds, with an average speed of 860.95 km/hr (534.97 mph).
 Robert DeLaurentis, 10 August 2020, the first pilot and aircraft (Turbine Commander 900 "Citizen of the World" N29GA) to successfully circumnavigate and use biofuels over the North and South poles. Initial departure from Gillespie Field, El Cahon, CA, was November 17, 2019, completed August 10, 2020 with a five-month delay due to Pandemic. Other first-time records include the longest distance flown in a twin or single engine turboprop—18.1 hours; first and fastest Polar circumnavigation in a twin or single engine turboprop; first testing for plastic microfibers across the globe including over the South and North poles.
 Zara Rutherford, 20 January 2022, became the youngest woman to fly solo around the world and the first person to complete the circumnavigation in a microlight. She began her westabout journey from her native Belgium on 18 August 2021.
 Mack Rutherford, 24 August 2022, became the youngest person to circumnavigate the world by aircraft solo and youngest person to circumnavigate the world by microlight.

Spacecraft
 On 12 April 1961 Yuri Gagarin made the first human flight in space, and completed the first orbit of the Earth, in Vostok 1, in 108 minutes.
 The second and third orbital circumnavigations, the first two to have multiple orbits, were made by Gherman Titov (17.5 orbits, a little over a day, for the Soviet Union) and John Glenn, in Friendship 7 (3 orbits, almost five hours, for the US, first American orbital flight), respectively.
 The first woman to circumnavigate the Earth in orbit, and to also do so multiple times, was Valentina Tereshkova, who made forty-eight orbits between 16 and 19 June 1963, aboard Vostok 6.
 Frank F. Borman II, James A. Lovell Jr., and William A. Anders, 21–27 December 1968, first human circumnavigation of the Earth-Moon system, 10 orbits around the moon in about 20 hours, aboard Apollo 8; total trip to the moon and back was more than 6 Earth days.

Human powered

 Thomas Stevens was the first person to circle the globe by bicycle. The feat was accomplished between 1884 and 1886. While impressive at the time, a good portion of the trip was by steamer due to technical and political constraints.
 Dave Kunst walked around the world between 20 June 1970 and 10 October 1974.
 Rick Hansen, a paraplegic athlete, became the first person to travel around the world in a wheelchair from 21 March 1985 to 22 May 1987, covering over  through 34 countries on four continents.
 Steve Strange completed the first true cycling circumnavigation, riding for 276 days in 2004–2005, following updated Guinness World Record rules for a proper circumnavigation. Nick Sanders had set the record for cycling around the Northern Hemisphere in 1984, which was considered a circumnavigation by earlier Guinness rules.
 Jesper Olsen travelled  from 1 January 2004 to 23 October 2005 during a circumnavigation solely on foot except for ocean crossings.
 Colin Angus circumnavigated the Northern Hemisphere solely by human power in 2006 but did not qualify under the Guinness guidelines as a human powered circumnavigation. His attempt, however, was recognized by National Geographic.
 Jason Lewis completed the first true human-powered circumnavigation (without sails or any motorized transport) from 12 July 1994 to 6 October 2007, covering  in both the southern and northern hemispheres and reaching two antipodal points, gaining accreditation from Guinness World Records and Adventurestats by Explorersweb.
 Rosie Swale-Pope travelled  from 2 October 2003 to 25 August 2008 during a circumnavigation solely on foot except for ocean crossings.
 Erden Eruç completed the first solo human-powered circumnavigation (without sails or any motorized transport) traveling by rowboat, sea kayak, foot and bicycle from 10 July 2007 to 21 July 2012. Erden crossed the equator two times, passed over 12 pairs of antipodal points, and logged  while setting 13 Guinness records for ocean rowing.
 Juliana Buhring completed the first cycling circumnavigation by a solo female in 2012 following updated Guinness World Record rules for a cycling circumnavigation.
 Paola Gianotti set the current record for the fastest cycling circumnavigation by a female in 2014.
 Mark Beaumont set the current record for the fastest cycling circumnavigation in 2017. He began his attempt on 2 July and finished on 18 September 2017, after 78 days, 14 hours, and 40 minutes, averaging about  a day on an  ride across Europe, Asia, Australia, New Zealand, and North America. Beaumont had also broken the same record in 2008.
 Jenny Graham set the current record for the fastest unsupported cycling circumnavigation in 2018. She completed the attempt in 124 days, 10 hours and 50 minutes, starting in Berlin on the 16th of June 2018, and arriving back on the 18th of October.

Miscellaneous
 King Kalākaua traveled around the world, over land and sea, thus becoming the first reigning monarch to complete such a journey in 1881.
 Nellie Bly traveled around the world with public steamboats and trains in 72 days (from November 14, 1889, to January 25, 1890), a world record, resembling the Around the World in Eighty Days novel.
 Clärenore Stinnes and Carl-Axel Söderström were the first persons to drive around the world in a car between 25 May 1927 and 24 June 1929.
 Friedrich Karl von Koenig-Warthausen, in a Klemm L.20 aircraft over land and via ship for ocean legs, circumnavigated the globe solo, between August 1928 and November 1929.
 Mrs Victor Bruce completed the first solo partially aerial circumnavigation by a woman (crossing oceans by vessel) in 1931.
 Beginning in Montreal, Ben Carlin circumnavigated the world in a modified Ford GPA Jeep between 1950 and 1958, becoming the first person to circumnavigate the world by amphibious vehicle.
 Heinz Stücke has been cycling around the world since 1962.
 Arthur Blessitt has been walking around the world carrying a  wooden cross since 1968, covering  through 324 countries.
 Sir Ranulph Fiennes, Charles Burton, et al.; 1979–1982; first circumnavigation via the North and South Poles on the Transglobe Expedition.
 Garry Sowerby holds four world records for circumnavigation in an automobile.
 Vladimir Lysenko circumnavigated the globe from west to east, deviating no more than two degrees of latitude from the Equator. Starting in Libreville, Gabon, Lysenko crossed (in a car, a motor boat, a yacht, a ship, a kayak, a bicycle, and by foot) Africa, Indian Ocean, Indonesia, Pacific Ocean, South America and Atlantic Ocean, finishing in Libreville in 2012.
 Kane Avellano became the youngest person to circumnavigate the globe by motorcycle on a trip completed just one day before his 24th birthday. The circumnavigation began on 31 May 2016 and ended on 19 January 2017, with a total duration of 233 days.

Non-global
 Phoenician expedition sent by Pharaoh Necho II; c. 600 BC; possibly circumnavigating Africa.
 Pytheas of Massalia apparently circumnavigated the British Isles circa 325 BC, though his account of the exploration is lost, except for references to it in the works of classical historians.
 Roman Governor Gnaeus Julius Agricola; c. 80; first confirmed circumnavigation of British Isles.
 Jacques Cartier; 1534–1535; first circumnavigation of Newfoundland.
 García de Nodal; 1619; first circumnavigation of Tierra del Fuego.
 Abel Tasman; 1642–1643; first circumnavigation of the Australian continent (including New Guinea and Tasmania).
 James Cook; 1769–1770; first circumnavigation of New Zealand.
 James Cook; 1772–1775; first circumnavigation of Antarctica (including New Zealand's South Island).
 George Bass and Matthew Flinders; 1798; first circumnavigation of Tasmania, Australia.
 Matthew Flinders; 1801–1803; first circumnavigation of Australia (without Tasmania).
 Fabian Gottlieb von Bellingshausen; 1820–1821; first circumnavigation of Antarctica (without New Zealand).
 Robert McClure; 1850–1854; first both to circumnavigate the Americas, and to transit the Northwest Passage. All by sea save for a 550 mile stretch on foot over pack ice from Mercy Bay to Beechey Island.
 Adolf Erik Nordenskiöld; 1878–1879; first circumnavigation of Eurasia, via the Northeast Passage and the Suez Canal, during the Vega expedition.
 St Roch; 1940–1942 and 1950; first vessel to circumnavigate North America. 1940–1942 Vancouver to Halifax, Nova Scotia, via the Northwest Passage. 1950, Halifax to Vancouver, via the Panama Canal.
 ; 1954; first vessel to circumnavigate North America in a single voyage, via the Panama Canal. Halifax west through Northwest Passage. South to Panama canal and return to Halifax.
 ; 1967; circumnavigated South America via the Panama Canal.
 Apollo 8; December 23, 1968; first crewed circumnavigation of the Moon.
 CCGS Hudson; 1970; first circumnavigation of North and South America.
 Miles Clark; 1992; circumnavigation of Europe, going from the White Sea to the Black Sea through several Russian waterways.
 The making waves foundation project team, 2003, achieved the world record for a non-stop, unassisted circumnavigation around Australia by a monohulled vessel. The 7 person crew was made up of Albert Lee (double amputee), Al Grundy (polio), Kim Jaggar (amputee), David Pescud (dyslexic), Phil Thompson(amputee), Harald Merlieb (hearing impaired) and Brett Pearce (spina bifida). It took skipper David Pescud, and his disabled crew 37 days and 1 hour to complete the sail. 
 Phoenicia (a replica of a Phoenician ship); 2009–2010; remade the possible circumnavigation of Africa, but completed the modern trip by going from Syria to the Red Sea via the Suez Canal.
 Børge Ousland in the yacht Northern Passage July–October 2010 and Daniel Gavrilov in the yacht Peter I; June–November 2010; first circumnavigation of the Arctic in a single season. Ousland claims to have crossed his wake north of Bergen on 14 October; it's unclear when Gavrilov crossed his wake.
 Matt Rutherford; June 2011 – April 2012; first single-handed, non-stop  sailing circumnavigation of the Americas, leaving from the mouth of the Chesapeake Bay, through the Northwest Passage, around Cape Horn, and back to the Chesapeake Bay. The Scott Polar Research Institute officially recognized Rutherford's  sailboat as the smallest vessel to ever transit the Northwest Passage.
 Tim Batstone; 1984; first non-stop windsurfing circumnavigation of the British Isles.
 Jonathan Dunnett; June–September 2015; first single-handed and unsupported, non-stop windsurfing circumnavigation of Britain.
 Jonathan Dunnett; May 2017 – May 2019; first single-handed and unsupported, non-stop windsurfing circumnavigation of Europe, from the border of Russia with Norway, to the border between Russia and Ukraine.

See also

 Around the world sailing record
 Circumnavigation world record progression
 List of pedestrian circumnavigators

References

 
 
Geography-related lists
Lists of expeditions
Lists of firsts